Alempue Airport was an airport serving Teno, a city in the Maule Region of Chile.

Google Earth Historical Imagery (1/3/2015) shows a well marked  grass runway. (12/7/2015) imagery shows the runway markings removed and the area plowed for crops. Drainage has been cut across the northwest portion of the field.

See also

Transport in Chile
List of airports in Chile

References

External links
OpenStreetMap - Alempue Airport

Defunct airports
Airports in Maule Region